

Regions 
Madagascar is divided into 22 regions:

Districts 
The 22 regions are further divided into the 114 districts.

History 

The constitution of 1992 ruled that the country should be organized in decentralized territorial entities. The name, number, and limits of territorial entities should be determined by law. In the law passed by the national assembly in 1994, three such entity levels were defined: region (faritra), department (departemanta) and commune (kaominina). The communes were created in 1996.

With Didier Ratsiraka back in power, the constitution was changed in 1998, to include and specifically mention six autonomous provinces, divided into undefined regions and communes. The autonomous provinces, having the same names and territories as the already existing provinces, were created in 2000.

During the power struggle after the presidential elections in 2001, five of those provinces, whose governors supported Ratsiraka, declared themselves independent from the republic. The new president, Ravalomanana, replaced the provincial governments by special delegations, appointed by the president. This effectively means that the autonomous provinces have ceased to exist as such, although it remains unclear whether they will remain in place.

In 2004, the regions were created by the national assembly in law no. 2004-001. The 28 regions originally proposed had become 22. Although they are subdivisions of the provinces, they are representatives (and representing the people) of the republic, not the province. The regions will also take over the assets of the "ex-Fivondronampokontany". It is also mentioned that the communes are the only entities that are operational, and there will be an unspecified period of transition to the new system. The departments are not mentioned in the law, instead the designation "components" of the regions is used. It appears that the departments will be based on the Fivondronampokontany, although it is unclear whether they are already in place and what it means that the assets will be taken over by the regions.

See also 
 Provinces of Madagascar
 Regions of Madagascar
 Districts of Madagascar
 List of cities in Madagascar

References 

 
Madagasc
Madagascar